Melissa Di Donato is an American-born businesswoman based in the United Kingdom and the CEO of SUSE.

Career
Early in her career, Melissa Di Donato worked on enterprise resource planning system, SAP R3. She had various positions at IBM, Salesforce, Oracle and eventually became the chief revenue officer of SAP's cloud division.

In mid-2019, Di Donato was appointed as the CEO of SUSE. In May of 2021, SUSE successfully listed on the Frankfurt Stock Exchange.

Melissa Di Donato serves as a non-executive director at JPMorgan Chase, is a member of the Supervisory Board of Porsche, and holds advisory roles at Notion Capital.

Philanthropy
Melissa Di Donato is the co-founder of Inner Wings, a foundation dedicated to empowering young girls. She is a trustee of Founders4Schools and the inaugural Technology Group chair of the 30% Club. She also served as a Stemettes Godmother and a mentor to young girls.

Melissa Di Donato has authored multiple children’s books.

References

External links 
 SUSE profile

American University alumni
American women chief executives
Year of birth missing (living people)
Living people